Otostylis is a genus of flowering plants from the orchid family, Orchidaceae, native to South America and Trinidad.

Otostylis alba (Ridl.) Summerh. - Venezuela, Brazil, Guyana
Otostylis brachystalix (Rchb.f.) Schltr. - Venezuela, Brazil, Guyana, Trinidad, Colombia, Peru 
Otostylis lepida (Linden & Rchb.f.) Schltr. - Venezuela, Brazil, Guyana, Suriname
Otostylis paludosa (Cogn.) Schltr. - Peru, Mato Grosso

See also 
 List of Orchidaceae genera

References 

 Berg Pana, H. 2005. Handbuch der Orchideen-Namen. Dictionary of Orchid Names. Dizionario dei nomi delle orchidee. Ulmer, Stuttgart

External links 

Zygopetalinae genera
Zygopetalinae